Krupka is a town in Teplice District in the Ústí nad Labem Region of the Czech Republic. It has about 12,000 inhabitants. The town is located in the Ore Mountain Mining Region, an UNESCO World Heritage Site, and during the late Middle Ages it was one of the world-leading producers of tin and silver.  The centre of Krupka is well preserved and is protected by law as an urban monument zone.

Administrative parts

Town parts and villages of Bohosudov, Fojtovice, Horní Krupka, Maršov, Nové Modlany, Soběchleby, Unčín and Vrchoslav are administrative parts of Krupka.

Etymology
The name "Krupka" was derived from an Old-Czech word krupý, which approximately means "large".

Geography

The southern part of the municipal territory with the built-up area lies the Most Basin, the northern part lies in the Ore Mountains.

On the southern border of Krupka there is the Kateřina Reservoir, built at the beginning of the 20th century. It was built as part of water management protection, and today it is also used for recreational purposes.

History
The origin of the original mining town is connected with the mining of tin ore and its further processing. The first written mention of Krupka is from 1305 in a deed of King Wenceslaus II. In 1330, existence of a guard fortress is mentioned. After the Hussite Wars, Krupka gained town privileges.

In the 17th century, problems with mining activities began to appear, and tin sales were stuck. The Thirty Years' War adversely affected mining. In 1708, the Clary-Aldringen family purchased the Krupka manor, and owned it until 1918.

In the 19th century, the economic centre moved to neighbouring Bohosudov with the establishment of new factories and lignite mines. In 1858, the railroad to Bohosudov was built. In 1898, Bohosudov was promoted to a town. From 1938 to 1945, Krupka was one of the municipalities in Sudetenland. In 1960, Bohosudov was merged with Krupka and became its most populated town part.

Demographics

Sights

The historic centre of Krupka is made up of Husitská Street, formerly the seat of various craftsmen. Today's appearance of the street consists of rebuilt or reconstructed originally Renaissance houses. The main landmark is the Church of the Assumption of the Virgin Mary from the 14th century. It was destroyed by fires many times and restored in 1668. Behind the church there is a town belltower from the 15th century. Above the church, there is the former town hall, today privately owned.

The Church of the Holy Spirit was built in 1440–1454, originally in the Gothic style. The third church in the street is the Church of Saint Wenceslaus from 1901. Above the street, there is a ruin of Krupka Castle. Only the massive walls have been preserved. It serves as a view point.

The big statue of Saint Francis Xavier belongs to the symbols of the town. It is a Baroque statue from 1717. It was built to commemorate the retreat of the plague.

The mining cultural landscape of Krupka was designated a UNESCO World Heritage Site in 2019 as part of the transnational Ore Mountain Mining Region. In connection with the mining, there was created an educational pathway leading from the Czech side to the German side and showing various historically important sites. In Husitská Street, there is the Infocentre of Krupka Mining Region with an exposition focused on history and life in Krupka, mining in the Ore Mountains, and an ore collection.

The Basilica of Our Lady of Sorrows is the most significant building in Bohosudov. It was built in the Baroque style by Octavio Broggio in 1701–1709 and has a pilgrimage tradition. It is protected as a national cultural monument.

Notable people
Carl Ferdinand von Arlt (1812–1887), Austrian ophthalmologist
Herta Lindner (1920–1943), German resistance fighter
Radim Breite (born 1989), footballer

Twin towns – sister cities

Krupka is twinned with:
 Geising (Altenberg), Germany

References

External links

 

Cities and towns in the Czech Republic
Populated places in Teplice District
Towns in the Ore Mountains